Darmstadt University refers to:
Darmstadt University of Technology (Technische Universität Darmstadt), founded in 1877
Darmstadt University of Applied Sciences (Hochschule Darmstadt), founded in 1971